Elachista szocsi is a moth of the family Elachistidae. It is found in Slovakia, Hungary, Russia, Uzbekistan and  Kazakhstan.

References

szocsi
Moths described in 1978
Moths of Europe
Moths of Asia